William L. Jackson may refer to:

William Lawies Jackson (1840–1917), British businessman and Conservative politician
William Lowther "Mudwall" Jackson, American Civil War general and Lieutenant Governor of Virginia

See also
William Jackson (disambiguation)